P2Y receptors are a family of purinergic G protein-coupled receptors, stimulated by nucleotides such as adenosine triphosphate, adenosine diphosphate, uridine triphosphate, uridine diphosphate and UDP-glucose.To date, 8 P2Y receptors have been cloned in humans: P2Y1, P2Y2, P2Y4, P2Y6, P2Y11, P2Y12, P2Y13 and P2Y14.

P2Y receptors are present in almost all human tissues where they exert various biological functions based on their G-protein coupling. P2Y receptors mediate responses including vasodilation, blood clotting, and immune response. Due to their ubiquity and variety in function, they are a common biological target in pharmacological development.

Structure 

P2Y receptors are membrane proteins belonging to the class A family of G protein-coupled receptors (GPCRs). P2Y receptor proteins display large-scale structural domains typical of GPCRs, consisting of seven hydrophobic transmembrane helices connected by three short extracellular loops and three variably sized intracellular loops; an extracellular N-terminus; and an intracellular C-terminus. The extracellular regions interact with the receptor ligands, while the intracellular regions activate the G protein, control receptor internalization, and mediate dimerization. Similar to other GPCRs, P2Y receptors can form both homodimers and heterodimers. These dimeric forms may vary significantly in their biochemical and pharmacological properties from the monomeric receptor.

In addition to the structural domains typical of all GPCRs, some structural elements are common across P2Y receptor subtypes. All P2Y receptors contain four extracellular cysteine residues which can form two disulfide bridges, one between the N-terminus domain and the proximal extracellular loop and another between the two remaining extracellular loops. These disulfide bonds have been shown to be involved in ligand binding and signal transduction. In addition, several polar residues found within the transmembrane helices are highly conserved across both species and receptor subtypes. Mutational analysis has suggested that these residues are integral to the ligand-binding mechanism of P2Y receptors. Outside of these conserved regions, the P2Y receptor family exhibits unusually high diversity in primary structure, with P2Y1 sharing only 19% of its primary structure with P2Y12. Despite this, the individual P2Y subtypes are highly conserved across species, with human and mouse P2Y receptors sharing 95% of amino acids.

The ligand-binding mechanisms of P2Y receptors are not currently well established. The binding complex of P2Y receptors with ATP is of significant interest, as no P2Y receptor contains amino acids sequences similar to any of the many established ATP-binding sites. Recent x-ray crystallography of the human P2Y12 receptor has shown several structural irregularities in regions that are typically highly conserved across GPCRs.

In contrast to the unusual structure and behavior of the extracellular ligand binding domains, P2Y intracellular domains appear to be structurally and mechanistically similar to other GPCRs.

Signal transduction 

P2Y receptors respond either positively or negatively to the presence of nucleotides in extracellular solution. Nucleotides may be divided into two categories: purines and pyrimidines. Individual P2Y receptor species may respond to only purines, only pyrimidines, or both; the activation profiles of the eight known P2Y receptors are listed below.

The activity of P2Y receptors is linked to a signal cascade originating in regulation of the flow of Ca2+ and K+ ions by the receptor's interactions with G proteins, modulating access to Ca2+ and K+ channels, though the exact behavior is dependent upon individual receptor species. Voltage-independent Ca2+ channels allow for the free flow of Ca2+ ions from the cell activated by P2Y receptors. Oscillation of Ca2+ concentration is directly affected by the signal-transduction activity of P2Y1; specifically, through protein kinase C phosphorylation of Thr339 in the carboxy terminus of the P2Y1 receptor.

Changes in the concentration of Ca2+ have many important ramifications for the cell, including regulation of cell metabolism (e.g. autophagy initiation / regulation), ATP production (through Ca2+ entering the mitochondrial outer mitochondrial membrane and stimulation of mitochondrial dehydrogenases leading to the production of ATP), and the possibility of triggering apoptosis. Both autophagy and apoptosis are cell stress responses that play significant roles in cells' overall life cycles, though autophagy seeks to preserve the viability of the cell by recycling unit parts of organelles, while apoptosis acts in the interest of the whole organism at the expense of the cell undergoing apoptosis.

Pharmacology 

Many commonly prescribed medications target P2Y receptors, and active research is being conducted into developing new drugs targeting these receptors. The most commonly prescribed drug targeting P2Y receptors is clopidogrel, an antiplatelet medication which acts on the P2Y12 receptor in a manner shared with other thienopyridines. Other pharmaceutical applications include denufosol, which targets P2Y2 and is being investigated for the treatment of cystic fibrosis, and diquafosol, a P2Y2 agonist used in the treatment of dry eye disease.

P2Y6 receptors have been shown to play a role in cerebral vasodilation. UDP-analogs which bind to this receptor have been investigated as possible treatments for migraines.

P2Y11 is a regulator of immune response, and a common polymorphism carried by almost 20% of North European caucasians give increased risk of myocardial infarction, making P2Y11 an interesting drug target candidate for treatment of myocardial infarction.

In addition to established uses, pharmaceutical research has been conducted into the role of P2Y receptors in osteoporosis, diabetes, and cardio-protection.

Coupling
The biological effects of P2Y receptor activation depends on how they couple to downstream signalling pathways, either via Gi, Gq/11 or Gs G proteins. Human P2Y receptors have the following G protein coupling:

The gaps in P2Y receptor numbering is due to that several receptors (P2Y3, P2Y5, P2Y7, P2Y8, P2Y9, P2Y10) were thought to be P2Y receptors when they were cloned, when in fact they are not.

See also 

 Receptor (biochemistry)
 Purinergic signalling
 Membrane protein
 Receptor theory

References

External links 
 Ivar von Kügelgen: Pharmacology of mammalian P2X- and P2Y-receptors, BIOTREND Reviews No. 03, September 2008,© 2008 BIOTREND Chemicals AG
 

G protein-coupled receptors